Tumu  is a border checkpoint in Libya at the Libya–Niger border in the Murzuq District. It is 310 kilometres south of Qatrun, the closest Libyan settlement on the desert road. Tumu consists of little more than a few government shacks, and the border checkpoint is frequently closed, which requires travellers crossing from Niger to report at Qatrun.

References

Anthony Ham (2002). Libya (Footscray, Victoria, Australia: Lonely Planet Publications) p. 87.

Libya–Niger border crossings